Conglomerate International is the fourth studio album by American post-hardcore band Frodus, released in 1998 through Tooth & Nail Records. The album focuses largely on the theme of corporatism.

Track listing

Personnel

Performers
Nathan Burke - Bass, vocals
Jason Hamacher - Drums, backing vocals
Shelby Cinca - Guitar, vocals
Jonathan Kreinik - Guitar (on "Last View"), keyboards (on "Transmissions Of An Unknown Origin" and "Explosions")

Production
Prof. Yaya - Layout, photography (credited as "Eye")
Tim Owen - Photography (Back cover and band photographs)
Uniphoto - Photography (Front cover)
Jonathan Kreinik - Production
Kurt Ballou - Production on pre-production demos
Bruce Kane - Recording, mixing

References

External links

1998 albums
Frodus albums